Pselnophorus poggei is a moth of the family Pterophoridae that is found in Ukraine, southern Russia, Iran and Asia Minor.

References

Moths described in 1862
Oidaematophorini
Moths of Asia
Moths of Europe
Taxa named by Josef Johann Mann